Annella is a genus of soft corals belonging to the family Subergorgiidae.

Species
 Annella mollis (Nutting, 1910)
 Annella reticulata (Ellis & Solander, 1786)

References
 WoRMS
 Gwannon

Subergorgiidae
Octocorallia genera